Haryanto Prasetyo (born 3 April 1978) is an Indonesian football player and manager who previously plays as midfielder for Persebaya Surabaya, Pelita Jaya FC, Persijatim, Persijap Jepara, PSS Sleman, Persiku Kudus and the Indonesia national team.

Club statistics

International career
He received his first international cap on 31 July 1999 and retired from the Indonesia national football team on 20 November 1999, appearing in 10 matches. Haryanto scored the first goal for Indonesia in the Football at the 1999 Southeast Asian Games against Malaysia.

International goals
|}

Hounors

Clubs
Persebaya Surabaya :
Liga Indonesia Premier Division champions : 1 (1997-98)

References

1978 births
Association football midfielders
Living people
Indonesian footballers
Indonesia international footballers
Persebaya Surabaya players
Pelita Jaya FC players
Persijatim players
Persijap Jepara players
PSS Sleman players
Persiku Kudus
Indonesian Premier Division players
Southeast Asian Games bronze medalists for Indonesia
Southeast Asian Games medalists in football
Competitors at the 1999 Southeast Asian Games